The McCormick Subdivision is a railroad line owned and operated by CSX Transportation in the U.S. states of Georgia and South Carolina. At its south end the line continues north from the Augusta Subdivision and at its north end the line continues north as the Monroe Subdivision.

History

The route from Augusta to Greenwood was constructed by the Augusta & Knoxville railroad in 1882. In 1886 it became part of the Port Royal and Western Carolina Railway and was later reorganized as the Charleston & Western Carolina Railway in 1896. The C&WC was later absorbed by the Atlantic Coast Line and passed through two more successor railroads, the Seaboard Coast Line and Seaboard System before finally being merged into CSX Transportation in 1986. Originally part of the larger Spartanburg Subdivision, the McCormick Subdivision was created in the early years following the creation of CSX.

References

CSX Transportation lines
Rail infrastructure in Georgia (U.S. state)
Rail infrastructure in South Carolina